During the 1995–96 English football season, Sunderland A.F.C. competed in the Football League First Division.

Season summary
After saving Sunderland from relegation the season before, Peter Reid was appointed manager on a permanent basis. His first full season as Sunderland manager, 1995–96, was successful as the club won the First Division title and gained promotion to the Premier League for the first time since the League restructuring which had taken effect in 1992–93.

Final league table

Results
Sunderland's score comes first

Legend

Football League First Division

FA Cup

League Cup

Players

First-team squad

References

Notes

Sunderland A.F.C. seasons
Sunderland